Zach Perez (born November 27, 1996) is an American professional soccer player who plays as a defender for USL League One club Richmond Kickers.

Raised in Edison, New Jersey, Perez attended Edison High School before transferring to Rutgers Preparatory School.

Career
Perez played college soccer at William Paterson University between 2015 and 2018, making 79 appearances, scoring 3 goals and tallying 6 assists.

Following college, Perez played with National Premier Soccer League side FC Motown during their 2019 season.

On September 5, 2019, Perez signed a professional contract with USL League One side Richmond Kickers.

References

External links 
 

1996 births
Living people
American soccer players
Association football defenders
FC Motown players
National Premier Soccer League players
People from Edison, New Jersey
Richmond Kickers players
Rutgers Preparatory School alumni
Soccer players from New Jersey
Sportspeople from Middlesex County, New Jersey
USL League One players
Edison High School (New Jersey) alumni